Thomas Costelloe (13 January 1887 – 15 September 1934) was an Irish Gaelic footballer. His championship career with the Kerry senior spanned fifteen years from 1903 until 1918.

Born in Tralee, County Kerry, Costelloe was born to Thomas and Mary Costelloe. He was educated locally before later working as a farmer and lime kiln operator.

As a dual player, Costelloe first played competitive football and hurling with the Tralee Mitchels club. In a lengthy career he won four county football championship medals between 1907 and 1917, as well as three county hurling championship medals between 1908 and 1912.

Costelloe was just sixteen-years-old when he made his debut as a substitute on the inter-county scene as a member of the Kerry senior football team in 1903. Over the course of the next fifteen years, he won three All-Ireland medals, beginning with a lone triumph in 1909 as captain, followed by back-to-back championships between 1913 and 1914. He also won eight Munster medals.

Honours

Tralee Mitchels
Kerry Senior Football Championship (4): 1907, 1908, 1910, 1917
Kerry Senior Hurling Championship (3): 1908, 1911, 1912

Kerry
All-Ireland Senior Football Championship (3): 1909 (c), 1913, 1914
Munster Senior Football Championship (8): 1905, 1908, 1909 (c), 1910 (c), 1912, 1913, 1914, 1915

References

1887 births
1934 deaths
Tralee Mitchels Gaelic footballers
Kerry inter-county Gaelic footballers